The 1934 Boston College Eagles football team represented Boston College as an independent during the 1934 college football season. The Eagles were led by seventh-year head coach Joe McKenney and played their home games at Alumni Field in Chestnut Hill, Massachusetts. The team finished with a record of 5–4. At the conclusion of the season, McKenney resigned as head coach, seemingly at the height of his career at 30 years old, to accept a position as assistant director of physical education for Boston Public Schools. McKenney was 44–18–3 while serving as head coach of Boston College.

Schedule

References

Boston College
Boston College Eagles football seasons
Boston College Eagles football
1930s in Boston